Eugenio Scomparini (1 September 1845 – 17 March 1913)  was an Italian painter.

Biography
He was born in Trieste, and initially took lessons there from the engraver Giovanni Moscotto at the School of Design. His mother, Maria Scomparini, had heralded from Venice. He moved with his friend Antonio Lonza to Venice. In 1863, using a stipend from the city of Trieste, he enrolled at the Accademia of Venice, where he trained with Michelangelo Grigoletti and Pompeo Molmenti. In 1873, he was nominated to the Arts council of the Museo Revoltella, which gave advice on the curation at the Museum.

In 1874–77, Scomparini traveled to Rome. He taught from 1887 to 1911 at the industrial School of Trieste. he painted decorations for the Theaters of Trieste, Split, Gorizia, and Treviso, among others. and for the palazzo Artelli in Trieste. His style recalls Mariano Fortuny and  Hans Makart. Some his works can be seen in the Revoltella Civic Museum of Trieste.

Among his pupils were Bruno Croatto, Ugo Flumiani, Piero Lucano, Ruggero Rovan, Marcello Dudovich, Piero Marussig, Argio Orell, Vito Timmel, Vittorio Bergagna, and Gino Parin.

References

External links

1845 births
1913 deaths
19th-century Italian painters
Italian male painters
20th-century Italian painters
Painters from Venice
Accademia di Belle Arti di Venezia alumni
Artists from Trieste
19th-century Italian male artists
20th-century Italian male artists